Eduard Sauer (1899 – 1 January 1975) was a German painter. His work was part of the painting event in the art competition at the 1936 Summer Olympics.

References

1899 births
1975 deaths
20th-century German painters
20th-century German male artists
German male painters
Olympic competitors in art competitions
Artists from Nuremberg